Jorge Páez Jr. (born 30 November 1987) is a Mexican professional boxer. His brother is welterweight prospect Azriel Páez and his father is the former world champion Jorge Páez.

Professional career
On June 5, 2010 Páez fought on a boxing card that also featured his younger brother Azriel; both of them won their fights.

Professional boxing record 

| style="text-align:center;" colspan="8"|40 wins (24 knockouts, 16 decisions), 13 losses, 2 draws, 1 no contest
|-  style="text-align:center; background:#e3e3e3;"
|  style="border-style:none none solid solid; "|Res.
|  style="border-style:none none solid solid; "|Record
|  style="border-style:none none solid solid; "|Opponent
|  style="border-style:none none solid solid; "|Type
|  style="border-style:none none solid solid; "|Rd., Time
|  style="border-style:none none solid solid; "|Date
|  style="border-style:none none solid solid; "|Location
|  style="border-style:none none solid solid; "|Notes
|- align=center
|Loss
|40-13-2
|align=left| Gustavo Daniel Lemos
|
|
|
|align=left|
|align=left|
|- align=center
|Loss
|40-12-2
|align=left| Jose Carlos Paz
|
|
|
|align=left|
|align=left|
|- align=center
|Loss
|40-11-2
|align=left| Ramón Álvarez
|
|
|
|align=left|
|align=left|
|- align=center
|Loss
|40-10-2
|align=left| Jose Carlos Paz
|
|
|
|align=left|
|align=left|
|- align=center
|Win
|40-9-2
|align=left| Daniel Sandoval
|
|
|
|align=left|
|align=left|
|- align=center
|Loss
|39-9-2
|align=left| Johnny Navarrete
|
|
|
|align=left|
|align=left|
|- align=center
|Loss
|39-8-2
|align=left| Antonio Margarito
|
|
|
|align=left|
|align=left|
|- align=center
|Loss
|39-7-2
|align=left| Carlos Ocampo
| 
|
|
|align=left|
|align=left|
|- align=center
|Win
|39-6-2
|align=left| Daniel Echeverria
| 
|
|
|align=left|
|align=left|
|- align=center
|Loss
|38-6-2
|align=left| Jose Benavidez
| 
|
|
|align=left|
|align=left|
|- align=center
|Win
|38-5-2
|align=left| Ronald Montes
| 
|
|
|align=left|
|align=left|
|- align=center
|Draw
|37-5-2
|align=left| Aaron Herrera
| 
|
|
|align=left|
|align=left|
|- align=center
|Loss
|37-5-1
|align=left| Vivian Harris
| 
|
|
|align=left|
|align=left|
|- align=center
|}

See also
Notable boxing families

References

External links

Boxers from Baja California
People from Mexicali
Welterweight boxers
1987 births
Living people
Mexican male boxers